O Rangreza, is a Pakistani romantic drama serial that aired on Hum TV. It starred Sajal Aly and Bilal Abbas in lead roles. It was written by Saji Gul and was directed by Kashif Nisar, who previously directed Dumpukht, which also starred Bilal Abbas Khan along with Sonia Mishal and Noman Ijaz.

Plot 
Sassi makes her father, Khayyam, her ideal and follows in his footsteps. She treats her mother Mumtaz "Mammo" precisely like how Khayyam treats her. Her maternal cousin, Qasim, starts taking an interest in Sassi but stops thinking about Khayyam's favours in the past. Khayyam loves an actress, Sonia Jahan, and Sassi starts to follow in her footsteps. She often visits Sonia and learns from her.

Sassi and Sonia perform at Khayyam's birthday. Khayyam finds this embarrassing and slaps her. Sassi starts hating her father. Khayyam wants Qasim to marry Sassi, but Qasim refuses it. Sassi finds solace in Sonia's ex-lover and director, Wajih, and starts working on his films. But Wajih dislikes her due to  Khayyam's affair with Sonia. Sassi's eldest brother, Tipu, comes from London with his girlfriend, Mina. Tipu is arrogant and stubborn like Sassi.

Sonia poisons Khayyam and escapes because she doesn't love him. Khayyam wakes up and repents over every persecution he did for Sonia Jahan. He is unable to complete the poetry he started for Sonia.

Mina takes an interest in Islam. She asks Qasim to choose a name for her. He chooses the name, Amna. Later, Amna falls for Qasim, but Qasim rejects her saying he can only love Sassi. Tipu transfers the house to Amna's name and decides to marry her. He plans to remove Khayam, Sonia, Sassi, and Mammo from the haveli. Qasim marries Amna and becomes the owner of the house, thus saving the members. Meanwhile, Sonia becomes ill, and her organs start failing. She dies in Khayyam's house. Sassi becomes an actress with her film “Sonia Jahan”, which is a tribute to the life of the actress.

Qasim falls in love with Amna and Sassi overhears and gets jealous. Now crazy to win Qasim back, she pushes Amna. But Amna is saved. Khayyam requests Amna to permit Qasim to marry Sassi. Amna unwillingly agrees. On the wedding day, Sassi rejects Qasim, as she realises that Qasim loves Amna.

Cast 
 Sajal Aly as Sassi
 Bilal Abbas Khan as Qasim
 Noman Ijaz as Khayam Sani
 Sana Fakhar as Sonia Jahan 
 Sonia Mishal as Mina/Amna
 Irsa Ghazal as Mumtaz
 Sohail Tariq
 Umer Dar as Ramazan
 Fareeha Jabeen
 Omair Rana as Wajih Kamal 
 Tanveer Malik
 Haseeb Khan
 Maryam Noor
 Rizwan Riaz
 Faisal Kichi
 Hamza Firdous as Tipu
 Waseem Akram

Production 
Bilal, on the set of O Rangreza, said that "It’s a beautiful story, I play a dye wala and my whole get-up is like that. I fall in love with a girl played by Sajal who is my first cousin, and from there the play will unravel and the story will unfold. All the characters involved have their own story to tell which will make O Rangreza an interesting watch as it is quite different. Besides Sajal and myself the play will also feature Nauman Ejaz and Sonia Mishal."

Soundtrack 

Initially, Sahir Ali Bagga sang and composed the song of O Rangreza. In September 2017, Sajal Aly, who played protagonist in the serial, also sang parts of the song with Sahir, which were also composed by him. All lyrics were written by the writer of the serial, Saji Gul, in the company Moomal Entertainment.

Release

Broadcast
The show was simultaneously broadcast by Hum Europe in UK, Hum TV MENA in UAE, and Hum World in the United States and Canada.

Home media and digital release
Initially, the show was available on the Hum TV official YouTube channel but later the channel deleted all the episodes. It was also available on the iflix app till 2019 when the channel's contract with the app terminated. In August 2019, Hum TV reuploaded all the episodes on their YouTube channel with muted music. Furthermore in July 2020, the show was released on the ZEE5 app along with some other Pakistani dramas.

Reception

Critical reception 

While reviewing the first episode, The Nation praised several performances, Gul's writing, and Nisar's direction.

Aly's performance and character "Sassi" was widely praised by the critics. Along with a few other television series of the season, DAWN Images listed it as a series with an off-beat story.

Accolades

See also 
 List of programs broadcast by Hum TV
 2017 in Pakistani television

References

Notes

External links 
 Hum TV Official Website

Pakistani drama television series
2017 Pakistani television series debuts
2018 Pakistani television series endings
Urdu-language television shows
Hum TV original programming
Hum TV